General Clayton may refer to:

Gilbert Clayton (1875–1929), British Army brigadier general
Henry DeLamar Clayton (general) (1827–1889), Confederate States Army major general 
Jasper Clayton (died 1743), British Army lieutenant general
Powell Clayton (1833–1914), United States Volunteers brigadier general in the American Civil War